Peace is an album by saxophonist Dayna Stephens.

Music and release
This was Stephens' fifth recording as leader. The other musicians are pianist Brad Mehldau, guitarist Julian Lage, bassist Larry Grenadier, and drummer Eric Harland. The tracks are mostly ballads. The title track "launches with Stephens blowing breathy, Mehldau filling in spaces gingerly, Harland brushing breezily. It stays that way for a good couple of minutes until Mehldau finds an opening; Stephens, not one to spoil the mood, takes the cue and maintains the hush."

The album was released by Sunnyside Records on November 4, 2014.

Reception

The PopMatters reviewer concluded that, "on Peace the leader is at his most contemplative and warm".

Track listing
"Peace" – 6:34
"I Left My Heart in San Francisco"  – 4:59
"Zingaro" – 7:48
"The Good Life" – 6:31
"The Duke" – 3:58
"Brothers" (From The Mission) – 1:43
"Deborah's Theme" (From Once Upon a Time in America) – 4:00
"Oblivion" – 4:59
"Body and Soul" – 6:32
"Two for the Road" – 6:09
"Moonglow" – 3:38

Personnel
 Dayna Stephens – baritone sax, tenor sax, soprano sax
 Brad Mehldau – piano
 Julian Lage - guitar
 Larry Grenadier - bass
 Eric Harland - drums

References

Sunnyside Records albums
2014 albums
Dayna Stephens albums